Esther Mujawayo (born 1958) is a Rwandan sociologist and psychotherapist. She survived the Rwanda genocide against the Tutsi in 1994, but lost many members of her family. She is the author of several books. In 1994, she founded the Association of Widows of the Rwandan Genocide. She gained a Graduate Diploma in Psychology from the University of East Anglia in 1997.

Works
 
  2004 Prix Ahmadou-Kourouma · 2004 Prix Ville du Cannet

See also
Women's World Award

References

1958 births
Rwandan psychotherapists
Rwandan writers
Rwandan women writers
Living people